Sinyakovo is a rural locality (a village) in Kubenskoye Rural Settlement, Kharovsky District, Vologda Oblast, Russia. The population was 14 as of 2002.

Geography 
Sinyakovo is located 24 km northwest of Kharovsk (the district's administrative centre) by road. Berezhok is the nearest rural locality.

References 

Rural localities in Kharovsky District